Rakushou! Pachi-Slot Sengen is a series of pachi-slot (Japanese slot machine) simulation games from Tecmo primarily for the PlayStation 2. While early games in the series featured several of Tecmo's real-life gambling machines, the fifth and sixth games focused on the Rio line of machines, as well as their star, Rio Rollins Tachibana, a character who later appeared in the 2010 Dead or Alive Paradise game, starred in the 2011 anime television series Rio: Rainbow Gate!, and appeared playable in the 2017 action game Warriors All-Stars.

Games
Rakushou! Pachi-Slot Sengen -  for PlayStation 2
Rakushou! Pachi-Slot Sengen 2 -  for PlayStation 2
Rakushou! Pachi-Slot Sengen 3 -  for PlayStation 2
Rakushou! Pachi-Slot Sengen 4 -  for PlayStation 2
Rakushou! Pachi-Slot Sengen 5: Rio Paradise -  for PlayStation 2
Rakushou! Pachi-Slot Sengen 6: Rio 2 Cruising Vanadis -  for PlayStation 2

See also
 Pachinko

References

2003 video games
Casino video games
Japan-exclusive video games
PlayStation 2-only games
PlayStation 2 games
Koei Tecmo franchises
Video games developed in Japan